Pimelea axiflora, commonly known as bootlace bush, is a small shrub in the family Thymelaeaceae and is endemic to Australia.  It is a small shrub with whitish flowers on mostly smooth stems.

Description
The leaves are green, smooth and leaf margins mostly recurved. The inflorescence consists of a cluster of 2-10 white flowers in leaf axils with little or no stalk.

Taxonomy
Pimelea axiflora was first formally described in 1854 by Carl Meisner and the description was published in Linnaea: ein Journal für die Botanik in ihrem ganzen Umfange, oder Beiträge zur Pflanzenkunde.

There are currently three subspecies accepted by the Australian Plant Census:

 P. axiflora subsp. Flowering occurs from June to December. In Tasmania it is restricted to King Island. In New South Wales it grows on the coast and ranges, south of the Budawang National Park to Braidwood. A single recording north of  Cooma and rare in the Snowy Mountains. This subspecies grows in wetter locations as an understory shrub in eucalypt scrubland and near streams.

 P. axiflora subsp.  subsp. alpina (Benth.) This species grows at higher altitudes in the Snowy Mountains in  open heath, rocky sites, woodland and herb and grass fields. Flowering occurs from November to March.

The  upper leaf surface usually smooth and secondary veins on underside obvious. Flowering occurs in September. It is only found in the Bungonia National Park south east of Goulburn N.S.W where it grows on rocky, limestone outcrops and cliffs.

Distribution
Bootlace bush is found at higher altitudes on the Grampians extending to the east coast in Victoria,  in south-eastern New South Wales and on King Island, Tasmania.

Conservation status
 P. axiflora subsp. axiflora  is listed as "endangered under the Threatened Species Protection Act 1995, Tasmania. 

 P. axiflora subsp. alpina is considered rare in Victoria.

 P. axiflora subsp. pubescens'' is listed as "endangered" under the Environment Protection and Biodiversity Conservation Act due to be known from a single population containing a low number of  mature plants.

References

axiflora
Malvales of Australia
Flora of New South Wales
Flora of Victoria (Australia)
Flora of Tasmania
Plants described in 1854
Dioecious plants